Liesbeth ("Lieja") Jantina Koeman, formerly Lieja Tunks, (born 10 March 1976 in Purmerend, North Holland) is a shot putter, who represents Canada after switching from the Netherlands in 2006.

Her personal best throw is 18.82 metres, achieved in June 2003 in Arnhem.

Achievements

External links

Website about Lieja Koeman

1976 births
Living people
Canadian female shot putters
Dutch female shot putters
Dutch female discus throwers
Olympic athletes of the Netherlands
Athletes (track and field) at the 2000 Summer Olympics
Athletes (track and field) at the 2004 Summer Olympics
World Athletics Championships athletes for the Netherlands
People from Purmerend
Sportspeople from North Holland